A list of Irish historians is presented in this article, from the earliest times up to the present day, by historical periods and in alphabetically order for easier reference.

Many of the earlier historians would have been known in their time as: "Irish Men and Women of Learning". A number of those listed below were scholars in different fields: literature, mathematics, theology, biography, narratives, hagiography, grammar.

Legendary and Pre-Historic Era 
 Fenius Farsaid

Early Medieval Era: 5th-12th centuries 

 Adamnan, died 704
 Aileran the Wise, died 665
 Bernard of Chartres
 Cadac-Andreas
 Candidus
 Clemens the Grammarian
 Cogitosus, fl. c. 650?
 Cummian
 Dicuil
 Donatus of Fiesole
 Finnian of Moville, died 579
 Iohannes
 Johannes Scottus Eriugena
 Mac Bethad, fl. 891
 Marianus Scotus of Mainz
 Martianus Hiberniensis of Laon
 Muirchu moccu Machtheni
 Pseudo-Augustine, fl. c. 655
 Ruben of Dairinis
 Secundinus
 Sedulius Scottus (Suadbar) fl. pre-844
 Tirechan
 Tuan mac Cairill, fl. pre-579
 Ultan of Ardbraccan, died 657

Late Medieval Era: 12th-16th centuries 

 Diarmaid Ó Cúlacháin, died 1221
 Adhamh O Cianain, died 1373
 Gilla Isa Mor mac Donnchadh MacFhirbhisigh, fl. 1390-1418
 Giolla na Naomh Mac Aodhagáin, fl. c. 1400
 Lawrence Walsh, fl. 1588
 Muireadach Albanach O Dalaigh, fl. c. 1220
 Seán Mor O Dubhagain, died 1372

Early Modern Era: 17th-19th centuries 

 Aonghus Ruadh na nAor O Dalaigh, died 1617
 James Ussher, Archbishop of Armagh, 1581-1656
 Thomas Carve, died 1672
 Charles O Conor, 1710-1791
 Cu Choigcriche O Cleirigh, c. 1662/1664
 Cú Choigcríche Ó Cléirigh, fl. 1627-1636
 Daniel O'Daly, died 1662
 Daibhidh O Duibhghennain, fl.1651-1696/1706
 Nicholas French, died 1678
 Dubhaltach MacFhirbhisigh, fl. 1643-1671
 Edward Ledwich, 1738-1823
 Eoin O Gnimh, fl. 1699
 John Colgan, OFM, 1592-1657
 Luke Wadding, OFM, 1588-1657
 George Petrie, 1790-1866
 James Hardiman, 1782-1855
 John O'Donovan, 1806-1861
 John O'Hart, 1824-1902
 Sylvester O'Halloran, 1728-1807
 Lughaidh O Cleirigh, fl. 1595-1630
 Matthew O Conor, 1773-1844
 Michael O'Clery, c. 1590-1643
 Owen Connellan, 1800-1869
 Peregrine O'Duignan, fl. 1627-1636
 Rev. Charles O Conor, 1767-1828
 Ruaidhri O Flaithbheartaigh, 1629-1716/1718
 Seathrún Céitinn/Geoffrey Keating, died 1643
 Sir James Ware, 1594-1666
 Sir John Thomas Gilbert, 1829-1898
 Sir William Petty, 1623-1687
 Standish Hayes O'Grady, 1832-1915
 Tadhg mac Daire Mac Bruaideadha, fl. 1616-1652
 Tuileagna Ó Maoil Chonaire, fl. 1638-1673
 Whitley Stokes, 1830-1909
 William Lecky, 1838-1903

Modern historians 

 James Auchmuty, 1909-1981
 Thomas Bartlett
 J. C. Beckett
 Lord Bew
 D. A. Binchy, 1899-1989
 Martin J. Blake, 1853-1931
 Peter Brown (historian)
 Ann Buckley
 Turtle Bunbury
 Francis John Byrne
 Nicholas Canny
 James Carney, 1914-1989
 Christine Casey
 Helena Concannon, 1878-1952
 R.V. Comerford
 Colm Connolly
 John de Courcy Ireland, 1911-2006
 Seán Cronin
 Louis Cullen
 Edmund Curtis, 1881-1943
 Maurice Curtis
 Fr. Patrick Dinneen SJ, 1860-1934
 Maureen Donovan O'Sullivan, 1887-1966
 Eamonn Duffy
 Owen Dudley Edwards
 Robin Dudley Edwards
 Marianne Elliott
 Ronan Fanning
 Brian Farrell
 Diarmaid Ferriter
 Roy Foster
 Tom Garvin
 Joe Graham 1944-
 Alice Stopford Green (1847–1929)
 Aubrey Gwynn, SJ, 1892-1983
 Stephen Gwynn, 1864-1950
 Gerard Anthony Hayes-McCoy, 1911-1975
 Kathleen Hughes, 1926-1977
 James Kelly (1959- )
 Dermot Keogh
 John Joseph Lee
 F. S. L. Lyons
 Kevin B. Nowlan (1921-2013)
 Dermot MacDermot, died 1989
 Edward MacLysaght, 1887-1986
 Eoin MacNeill, 1867-1945
 Gearóid Mac Niocaill
 Gearóid Mac Eoin
 F. X. Martin, 1922-2000
 Carmel McCaffrey
 Robert B. McDowell
 Hugh McFadden
 Hiram Morgan, 1960-
 Kenneth Nicholls
 Donnchadh Ó Corráin
 Dáibhí Ó Cróinín
 Patrick Denis O'Donnell
 Pádraig Ó Fiannachta
 Cormac Ó Gráda
 Nollaig Ó Muraíle
 T. F. O'Rahilly, 1883-1953
 Pádraig Ó Riain
 Matthew Potter
 Barry Raftery
 Sharon Slater
 ATQ Stewart
 Fr. Paul Walsh, 1885-1941
 Patrick Weston Joyce1827-1914
 Michael Coleman Kelly1960-
 Arthur Keaveney 1951-2020

 
 
Historians